Daler may refer to:

Currency
 Scandinavian daler, a version of the thaler, introduced to Scandinavia in the 17th century
 Danish rigsdaler
 Danish West Indian rigsdaler
 Greenlandic rigsdaler
 Norwegian rigsdaler
 Norwegian speciedaler
 Swedish riksdaler

People
 Daler Kuzyayev (born 1993), Russian footballer
 Daler Mehndi (born 1967), Indian singer
 Daler Nazarov (born 1959), Tajik composer and actor
 Daler Tukhtasunov (born 1986), Tajikistani footballer
 Daler Xonzoda (born 1989), Uzbek singer
 Jennifer Daler, New Hampshire politician
 Jiří Daler (born 1940), Czech Olympic cyclist

Other uses
 , a community in Tønder Municipality, Region of Southern Denmark
 Daler-Rowney, a British art materials manufacturer